The WC-135 Constant Phoenix is a special-purpose aircraft derived from the Boeing C-135 Stratolifter and used by the United States Air Force. Its mission is to collect samples from the atmosphere for the purpose of detecting and identifying nuclear explosions. It is also informally referred to as the "weather bird" or "the sniffer" by workers on the program and international media respectively.

Operational history

The WC-135 was introduced in December 1965, replacing Boeing WB-50 aircraft in the weather-reconnaissance and air-sampling mission. Ten aircraft were initially converted from C-135B transport aircraft and were placed in service with the 55th Weather Reconnaissance Squadron at McClellan Air Force Base, California, with the Military Airlift Command (MAC). Detachments were located at various bases throughout the United States and worldwide. The aircraft occasionally took on other roles throughout their careers; several aircraft were temporarily assigned to the 10th Airborne Command and Control Squadron at RAF Mildenhall in the late 1980s and early 1990s as training aircraft so that the unit could slow the accumulation of flight hours on its EC-135Hs, while others served as staff transports on an as-needed basis.

Upon retirement from frontline weather reconnaissance service in the early 1990s, five were retained for further use. Serial no. 61-2666 was converted to an NC-135 and remains in service as a testbed for RC-135 equipment upgrades. Serial no. 61-2667 was upgraded to a WC-135W, given the project name Constant Phoenix, and remains in service with the 45th Reconnaissance Squadron at Offutt Air Force Base, Nebraska. Serial no. 61-2674 was converted to the first OC-135B Open Skies observation aircraft, reentering service in 1993. It was later stored in 1997 and replaced with two additional aircraft also converted from WC-135s.

In 1998, a former EC-135C, serial no. 62-3582, was converted into a WC-135C, also designated Constant Phoenix.

In April 2018 it was announced that three KC-135R tanker aircraft would be converted as WC-135R Constant Phoenix aircraft to replace the two aircraft operated by the 45th Reconnaissance Squadron. The first aircraft is scheduled to be converted by L3 Technologies at Greenville, Texas starting in September 2019.

In November 2020, WC-135C, tail number 62-3582, was retired during a ceremony at Offutt Air Force Base, Nebraska. During its 56 year career, it amassed 29,680 flight hours and 72,251 landings. During its retirement ceremony, the 55th Wing chaplain dubbed the aircraft "Lucifer's Chariot", although the aircraft was never referred to by that name during its operational life.

In June 2022, the first of three planned aircraft (serial number 64-14836) completed its maiden test flight, and was delivered to the 55th Wing on 11 July.

Mission
The WC-135B and WC-135W Constant Phoenix atmospheric-collection aircraft support national-level intelligence consumers by collecting particulate debris and gaseous effluents from accessible regions of the atmosphere in support of the Limited Nuclear Test Ban Treaty of 1963.

Features
The Constant Phoenix's modifications are primarily related to the aircraft's on-board atmospheric collection suite, which allows the mission crew to detect radioactive debris "clouds" in real time. The aircraft is equipped with external flow-through devices to collect particulates on filter paper and a compressor system for whole air samples collected in high-pressure holding spheres. Despite the different designations, both the C- and W-models carry the same mission equipment (with a front-end avionics suite similar to the RC-135V and W aircraft).

The interior seats 33 people, including the cockpit crew, maintenance personnel, and special equipment operators from the Air Force Technical Applications Center. On operational sorties, the crew is minimized to just pilots, navigator, and special-equipment operators, to reduce radiation exposure to mission-essential personnel only.

Variants
WC-135B - 10 initial aircraft, converted from C-135Bs
WC-135C - Converted from former Looking Glass EC-135C Tail Number 62-3582, carries the same equipment as WC-135W
WC-135R - 3 converted KC-135Rs, announced in 2018 and included on the FY19 budget request. The first converted aircraft, Tail Number 64-14836, was delivered in July 2022.
WC-135W - Re-designation of WC-135B Tail Number 61-2667 after upgrades and removal of flight engineer crew position in the 1990s.

Operators

 United States Air Force – Air Combat Command
55th Wing – Offutt AFB, Nebraska
45th Reconnaissance Squadron

Specifications

Activities

Vela Incident
WC-135B aircraft flew 25 sorties in 1979 to try to ascertain whether a double flash in the South Atlantic that was detected by a Vela satellite was a nuclear weapons test, however, the result was inconclusive.

Iran
The Constant Phoenix aircraft was active the day after Iran conducted Operation Martyr Soleimani, sending missiles into Al Asad Air Base in Al Anbar Governorate, western Iraq on January 8, 2020.

North Korea
On October 6, 2006, Japan's Kyodo News agency reported that a US military aircraft, equipped to detect radiation from a nuclear test, took off from southern Japan. This was believed to be part of US efforts to prepare to monitor a North Korean nuclear test.

On October 9, 2006, North Korea's official Korean Central News Agency (KCNA) reported that the country had performed a successful underground nuclear test.

On October 13, 2006, CNN reported: "The U.S. Air Force flew a WC-135 Constant Phoenix atmospheric collection aircraft on Tuesday to collect air samples from the region. A preliminary analysis of air samples from North Korea shows 'radioactive debris consistent with a North Korea nuclear test', according to a statement from the office of the top U.S. intelligence official. The statement, from the office of Director of National Intelligence John Negroponte, was sent to Capitol Hill but not released publicly. CNN obtained it from a congressional source. The national intelligence office statement said the air samples were collected Wednesday, and analysis found debris that would be consistent with a nuclear test 'in the vicinity of Punggye' on Monday. The South Korean Defense Ministry told CNN that the United States has informed it that radioactivity has been detected." The aircraft was based at Offutt AFB and was sent to Kadena Air Base on Okinawa to operate during the sampling missions.

On June 17, 2009, JoongAng Daily reported, in reference to a purported May 25 nuclear test by North Korea: "The U.S. Air Force twice dispatched a special reconnaissance jet, the WC-135 Constant Phoenix from Kadena Air Base in Okinawa, Japan, to collect air samples."

On November 23, 2010, Sankei Shimbun reported that a WC-135 had been moved to Kadena Air Base in September 2010, in anticipation of a North Korean nuclear test.

On January 31, 2013, the WC-135W was reported to be conducting surveillance flights out of Kadena Air Base in anticipation of another North Korean nuclear test.

On January 6, 2016, the United States Air Force confirmed plans to soon deploy the WC-135 to test for radiation near North Korea to examine North Korea's claim that they had successfully conducted a hydrogen-bomb test on January 5 (EST).

On September 8, 2016, it was reported that the WC-135 would soon begin surveillance flights near the Korean Peninsula after South Korean officials confirmed that North Korea conducted its fifth nuclear test at approximately 0:30 UTC.

On April 12, 2017, it was deployed to Okinawa amid rising tensions with North Korea. North Korea conducted a missile test on April 3, 2017.

On May 19, 2017, two Chinese Su-30 fighter jets intercepted a WC-135 over the East China Sea, prompting a formal complaint from the Pentagon.

Japan
On March 17, 2011, CNN reported that the WC-135W had been deployed from Offutt Air Force Base in Nebraska to Eielson Air Force Base in Alaska. From there it assisted in detecting radioactive materials in the atmosphere around Japan, monitoring radioactivity released from the Fukushima I Nuclear Power Plant caused by the magnitude 9.0 earthquake and subsequent tsunami of March 11, 2011.

Europe
In 1986, multiple WC-135Bs were deployed to Europe to help monitor the air after the Chernobyl disaster.

On February 17, 2017, it was reported that the WC-135C had been deployed to RAF Mildenhall. It was conjectured that this came in response to several reports of anomalous levels of iodine-131 coming from the Norwegian-Russian Border. As of April 10, 2017, there was no official cause of the iodine-131 release.

Also by the end of July and in early August 2021 a WC-135W deployed to Europe and carried out measurements over the Baltic Sea and Sweden, using the callsign JAKE21. A connection is suspected with the technical problems of the Russian Oscar-II-class submarine Orel, which subsequently had to be tugged back.

On February 7, 2022, a WC-135W Constant Phoenix (Reg. 61-2667, Mode-S hex code AE0941) using callsign JAKE21 was observed on various publicly accessible flight trackers conducting a 14 hour round trip from RAF Mildenhall to the Eastern Mediterranean south of Cyprus. The same aircraft was also observed over the Baltic Sea on the 22nd of the same month, again using public flight trackers. On March 28, 2022, the same aircraft was again observed on public flight trackers, this time flying a brief mission up and down the East coast of Great Britain.  On April 28, 2022, the same aircraft flew a similar mission up and down the East coast of England and Scotland, again using the callsign JAKE21

Middle East
On March 1, 2021, WC-135W PYTHN58 seen over Persian Gulf.

See also
Bhangmeter

References

General

External links
 USAF: WC-135 Constant Phoenix – Factsheet
 Airliners.net Boeing WC-135W (717-158)
 GlobalSecurity.org WC-135 page
 Fas.org WC-135 page
 CNN coverage of Constant Phoenix and North Korean Nuclear Test

C-135W Constant Phoenix
C-0135W Constant Phoenix
Quadjets
Low-wing aircraft